The Scarab Murder Case is a 1936 film directed by Michael Hankinson. It is part of a series of films about fictional detective Philo Vance. Paramount Pictures intended for William Powell to portray the character, as he had in three prior Paramount films - The Canary Murder Case (1929), The Greene Murder Case (1929) and The Benson Murder Case (1930) - as well as The Kennel Murder Case (1933) for Warner Bros. However, Powell changed studios, and the role went to Wilfrid Hyde-White.

The British Film Institute has placed it on its BFI 75 Most Wanted list of lost films.

Cast
Wilfrid Hyde-White as Philo Vance
Wally Patch as Inspector Moor
Kathleen Kelly as Angela Hargreaves
Henri De Vries as Dr. Bliss
John Robinson as Donald Scarlett
Wallace Geoffrey as Salveter
Stella Moya as Meryt Amen
Graham Cheswright as Makeham

References

External links
BFI 75 Most Wanted entry, with extensive notes

British crime films
British mystery films
British black-and-white films
Films based on American novels
Lost British films
1936 crime films
Films produced by Anthony Havelock-Allan
British and Dominions Studios films
1936 mystery films
1936 films
1936 lost films
1930s British films
Philo Vance films
1930s English-language films